Brockmeyer is a surname. Notable people with the surname include:

Henry Clay Brockmeyer (1826–1906), German-American politician
Oscar Brockmeyer (1883–1954), American soccer player
Win Brockmeyer (1907–1980), American football coach

See also
Brockmeyer v. Dun & Bradstreet, legal case in Wisconsin